Kaveh Nabatian is an Iranian-Canadian musician and film director, known as a trumpeter and keyboardist with the Juno Award winning orchestral post-rock band Bell Orchestre.

Career
As a filmmaker Nabatian is noted for his 2010 short film Vapor, about an older Mexican man who comes to terms with homosexuality.  The film was a Genie Award nominee for Best Live Action Short Drama at the 31st Genie Awards, and a Prix Jutra nominee for Best Short Film at the 13th Jutra Awards, as well as one of TIFF’s Canada's Top Ten films for the year.

In 2017, Nabatian directed Leonard Cohen: A Crack in Everything, a documentary on Leonard Cohen which was broadcast by both CBC Television in English and Ici Radio-Canada Télé in French. In 2019, he was the lead director, alongside Sophie Goyette, Juan Andrés Arango, Sophie Deraspe, Karl Lemieux, Ariane Lorrain and Caroline Monnet, of the experimental anthology film, The Seven Last Words (Les sept dernières paroles), set to the music of Joseph Haydn’s The Seven Last Words of Our Saviour on the Cross, Op. 51. It premiered at the International Film Festival Rotterdam.

Nabatian's debut feature film, Sin La Habana, about an Afro-Cuban ballet dancer who seduces an Iranian Jewish woman in order to escape Cuba, premiered at the Festival du nouveau cinéma in 2020 before being commercially released in 2021. The film stars Yonah Acosta and was written in collaboration with Cuban hip hop producer Pablo Herrera. He received a Canadian Screen Award nomination for Best Original Screenplay at the 10th Canadian Screen Awards in 2022 for Sin La Habana.

He has also directed music videos for artists including Bell Orchestre, Leif Vollebekk, The Barr Brothers, Sarah Neufeld, Little Scream, Lakou Mizik & Joseph Ray and Half Moon Run.

Filmography

Discography

Bell Orchestre
 Recording a Tape the Colour of the Light (2005)
 Who Designs Nature's How (2009)
 As Seen Through Windows (2009)
 House Music (2021)

Awards and nominations

References

External links

 

Film directors from Montreal
Musicians from Montreal
Canadian music video directors
Canadian documentary film directors
Canadian trumpeters
Canadian indie rock musicians
Canadian people of Iranian descent
Living people
Year of birth missing (living people)